XML Shareable Playlist Format (XSPF), pronounced spiff, is an XML-based playlist format for digital media, sponsored by the Xiph.Org Foundation.

XSPF is a file format for sharing the kind of playlist that can be played on a personal computer or portable device. In the same way that any user on any computer can open any Web page, XSPF is intended to provide portability for playlists.

Content resolution 
Traditionally playlists have been composed of file paths that pointed to individual titles. This allowed a playlist to be played locally on one machine or shared if the listed file paths were URLs accessible to more than one machine (e.g., on the Web). XSPF's meta-data rich open format has permitted a new kind of playlist sharing called content resolution.

A simple form of content resolution is the localisation of a playlist based on metadata. An XSPF-compliant content resolver will open XSPF playlists and search a catalog for every title with <creator>, <album> and <title> tags, then localise the playlist to reference the available matching tracks. A catalog may reference a collection of media files on a local disk, a music subscription service like Yahoo! Music Unlimited, or some other searchable archive. The end result is shareable playlists that are not tied to a specific collection or service.

Example of an XSPF 1.0 playlist 
<?xml version="1.0" encoding="UTF-8"?>
<playlist version="1" xmlns="http://xspf.org/ns/0/">
  <trackList>
    <track>
      <title>Windows Path</title>
      <location>file://C:\music\foo.mp3</location>
    </track>
    <track>
      <title>Linux Path</title>
      <location>file:///media/music/foo.mp3</location>
    </track>
    <track>
      <title>Relative Path</title>
      <location>music/foo.mp3</location>
    </track>
    <track>
      <title>External Example</title>
      <location>http://www.example.com/music/bar.ogg</location>
    </track>
  </trackList>
</playlist>

History 
XSPF was created by an ad hoc working group that commenced activities in February 2004, achieved rough consensus on version 0 in April 2004, worked on implementations and fine tuning throughout summer and fall 2004, and declared the tuned version to be version 1 in January 2005.

XSPF is not a recommendation of any standards body besides the Xiph.Org Foundation.

Features 
 A playlist format like M3U or ASX
 MIME content-type of application/xspf+xml
 Patent-free (no patents by the primary authors)
 Specification under the Creative Commons Attribution-NoDerivs 2.5 license
 XML, like Atom
 Unicode support
 Cross-platform support

Software and web playlist converters 

 Amarok
 Foobar2000 (with appropriate plugin)
 Audacious
 Banshee
 Clementine
 Tomahawk
 VLC media player (stand-alone player, available on every major platform)
 XMMS2 (has a plugin to parse XSPF)
 Last.fm (export of playlists and personal tag radios in XSPF)
 Soundiiz (playlist converter for several streaming sites)
 youtube-dl (downloader)

See also

 Other playlist file formats
 ASX - Windows media
 M3U - The most common playlist format
 PLS - SHOUTcast
 WPL - Windows Media Player

References

External links 
 
 Online XSPF Validator
 XSPF Version 1 specification.

Open formats
Playlist file formats
Playlist markup languages
Xiph.Org projects
XML-based standards